Peremyshl is a rural locality (a selo) and the administrative center of Peremyshlsky District of Kaluga Oblast, Russia.

Formerly a capital of one of the Upper Oka Principalities, Peremyshl contains the ruins of a mid-16th century cathedral which collapsed in the 1980s from neglect. Descendants of the local rulers include the Vorotynsky and Gorchakov families.

References

External links
 

Rural localities in Kaluga Oblast
Peremyshlsky Uyezd